Friederike (minor planet designation: 538 Friederike) is a minor planet in the asteroid belt.

Photometric observations at the Organ Mesa Observatory in New Mexico during 2012 showed a rotation period of 46.728 ± 0.004 hours with a brightness
variation of 0.25 ± 0.02 in magnitude.

References

External links
 
 

Hygiea asteroids
Friederike
Friederike
19040718